Dianchi Lake, also known as Lake Dian and Kunming Lake, is a large lake located on the Yunnan-Guizhou Plateau close to Kunming, Yunnan, China. Its nickname is the "Sparkling Pearl Embedded in a Highland" and it was the model for the Kunming Lake in the Summer Palace in Beijing. Its name is the source of Yunnan's Chinese abbreviation .

It is the eighth largest lake in China and the largest in Yunnan Province.

Etymology

The Chinese character for the lake is a phonosemantic compound of the radical  ("water") and the character , whose current pronunciation is zhēn but whose Old Chinese pronunciation has been reconstructed as *tin in Baxter–Sagart system. The character was first found in the Records of the Grand Historian as the name of Dian Kingdom. Modern studies suggest that the element "Dian" is derived from the language of the ancient extinct Bo people and means basin. The character 滇 was use as the name of the lake since the Han dynasty set "Dianchi County" (滇池县) in 109 BC.

History
Dianchi Lake was the site of the capital of the independent kingdom of the Cuan during the first millennium AD. At that time, it was known as Kunchuan.

Pollution
Pollution is a major problem for the lake. In the city of Kunming, the capital of Yunnan province, parts of which are subtropical, there was traditionally no talk of water shortage, since the city is right next to one of Asia's biggest freshwater lakes. However, 90 percent of Kunming's wastewater was dumped untreated into the lake until the first wastewater plant was built in 1990. In addition, much of the marsh system around the lake was destroyed during the Great Leap Forward in a misguided effort to raise rice production by filling the marshes in with trucked-in soil.  Agricultural runoff is also a major problem.

As early as 2001, the lake's water became undrinkable despite several billion US dollars having been spent trying to clean it up. Some experts estimated that over 55% of the lake's fish population has been killed off by this disease-ridden type of pollution. The water in the lake is rated Grade V (the worst grade) which makes the water unfit for agricultural or industrial uses. As of 2020, the water in the lake was still rated Grade V.

Biodiversity
Together with other Yunnan lakes (Fuxian, Qilu, Yangzong, Xingyun, and Yilong), Dian Lake is recognized as an ecoregion. Among three major Yunnan lakes with a high number of endemics, the other two being Fuxian and Erhai, the most drastic loss of biodiversity has been seen in the Dian. Of the 25 native fish species and subspecies in Dian Lake, 10 are endemic to the basin: Acheilognathus elongatus, Anabarilius alburnops, Anabarilius polylepis, Cyprinus micristius micristius, Liobagrus kingi, Pseudobagrus medianalis, Silurus mento, Sinocyclocheilus grahami, Sphaerophysa dianchiensis and Xenocypris yunnanensis. Today the only endemic fish known to survive in the lake itself is Anabarilius alburnops, but it is endangered. The remaining have not been recorded there since the 1990s or earlier, and most of these are likely extinct. Two other species, Schizothorax grahami and Yunnanilus nigromaculatus, are endemic to the general region, but have also disappeared from Dian Lake itself. Among the non-endemic natives, only gold fish and Asian swamp eel still live in Dian Lake. In contrast to the status of the natives, the lake is now home to more than 25 introduced fish species.

The Yunnan lake newt (Cynops wolterstorffi) was endemic to the lake, but it has not been seen since 1979 and is considered extinct.

Many native hydrophytes have also disappeared from the lake.

Gallery

See also
Zheng He
Dian Kingdom
List of lakes in China

References

Further reading
Developing a Suitability Index for Residential Land Use: A case study in Dianchi Drainage Area (2006)

External links

Kunming Dianchi Administration Bureau

National parks of China
Lakes of Yunnan
Geography of Kunming